Taichang is the chief official in charge of religious rites and rituals in ancient China.

Taichang may also refer to:

Taichang, Gansu (太昌镇), a town in Ning County, Gansu, China

Historical eras
Taichang (泰常, 416–423), era name used by Emperor Mingyuan of Northern Wei
Taichang (太昌, 532), era name used by Emperor Xiaowu of Northern Wei
Taichang (泰昌, 1620), era name used by the Taichang Emperor (Emperor Guangzong of Ming)